Sergey Vladimirovich Aleksashenko (born 23 December 1959, Likino-Dulyovo) is a Russian economist and former government official. He was the deputy finance minister and first deputy chairman of the board of the Central Bank of Russia from 1995 to 1998.

Biography

Early life and education
Sergei Aleksashenko was born in 1959 into a family of engineers. Upon graduating from high school, he entered the MGIMO, but was expelled after his first year. Two years later, the Komsomol sent Aleksashenko to study at the Moscow State University. He graduated from the university in 1986 and later obtained a PhD in economic sciences.

Political stance
In May 2014, Aleksashenko publicly criticised the annexation of Crimea by the Russian Federation.

In March 2020, he signed an appeal against the amendments to the Russian Constitution proposed by Vladimir Putin.

In 2022, Aleksashenko condemned Russian invasion of Ukraine. As of 2023, he is one of the members of the Anti-War Committee of Russia.

Personal life
Aleksashenko is married, he has three children.

Selected works

References

External links

1959 births
20th-century Russian economists
21st-century Russian economists
Living people
People from Orekhovo-Zuyevsky District
Central Bank of Russia
Russian activists against the 2022 Russian invasion of Ukraine
Russian emigrants to the United States
People's Freedom Party politicians
Moscow State University alumni